Pioneer Union Elementary School District is a public school district in Hanford, California, United States.

History
The Pioneer district is one of the oldest in the area.  According to records at the Hanford Carnegie Museum, Pioneer School was started on Aug. 5, 1870.  Back then, it was a two-story building with a belfry.  Pioneer originally served the rural area of Grangeville, but now serves from the edge of Lemoore to Hanford.

Schools
 Frontier Elementary School
Pioneer Elementary School
Pioneer Middle School

References

External links
 

School districts in Kings County, California
Hanford, California
School districts established in 1870
1870 establishments in California